Philomedusa is a monotypic genus of cnidarians belonging to the family Haloclavidae. The only species is Philomedusa vogtii.

References

Haloclavidae